Of an estimated 200 place names the Dutch bestowed on Australian localities in the 17th century as a result of the Dutch voyages of exploration along the western, northern and southern Australian coasts, only about 35 can still be found on current maps. Five out of six names were either renamed or forgotten or their locations were lost. Other places were named after the early Dutch explorers by later British explorers or colonists, for instance the Australian state of Tasmania is named after Abel Tasman. Australia itself was called New Holland by the English and Nieuw Holland by the Dutch.

Places named by the Dutch

Queensland 
The Dutch charted the western side of Cape York Peninsula and the coast of the Gulf of Carpentaria. Willem Janszoon made the first recorded European landfall in Australia during the Janszoon voyage of 1605-6.

Renamed

Northern Territory

Western Australia

South Australia

Tasmania

Places named after the Dutch 

Other places were given Dutch names by later explorers or colonists in honour of the Dutch. These include:

Duyfken Point -  near Weipa where Willem Janszoon first sighted the Australian coast in 1606.
Tasmania - Australian state, along with 31 other places with the name of Tasman in Tasmania
Mount Heemskirk and Mount Zeehan -  named by George Bass and Matthew Flinders after Abel Tasman's ships Heemskerck and Zeehaen in 1798. It is near where Tasman first sighted Tasmania. The township of Zeehan, Tasmania near Mount Zeehan was established after the discovery of tin, lead and silver deposits in 1890.
 Geelvink Channel was named after a ship, but the ship was named after Joan Geelvinck
 Vansittart Bay on the coast of Western Australia is a unique anomaly. It was named by Phillip Parker King after Nicholas Vansittart, who was an English politician of Dutch descent.

See also
List of place names of Dutch origin
First Dutch Expedition to Indonesia
Second Dutch Expedition to Indonesia
Dutch East India Company in Indonesia
European exploration of Australia
New Holland (Australia)
Janszoon voyage of 1606
Voyage of the Pera and Arnhem to Australia in 1623
History of the Northern Territory
History of Western Australia
History of South Australia
History of Tasmania

References

Sources
 Project Gutenberg, Abel Tasman's Journal
 Dutch settlers in South Australia
 Project Gutenberg, The Discovery of Tasmania (Van Diemen's Land.), New Zealand, and Bass' Straits.

Dutch
Dutch
Dutch language lists
Maritime history of the Dutch East India Company
Dutch-Australian culture